The Crystal Ball function, named after the Crystal Ball Collaboration (hence the capitalized initial letters), is a probability density function commonly used to model various lossy processes in high-energy physics. It consists of a Gaussian core portion and a power-law low-end tail, below a certain threshold. The function itself and its first derivative are both continuous.

The Crystal Ball function is given by:

where

,
,
,
,
.

External links
 J. E. Gaiser, Appendix-F Charmonium Spectroscopy from Radiative Decays of the J/Psi and Psi-Prime, Ph.D. Thesis, SLAC-R-255 (1982). (This is a 205-page document in .pdf form – the function is defined on p. 178.)
 M. J. Oreglia, A Study of the Reactions psi prime --> gamma gamma psi, Ph.D. Thesis, SLAC-R-236 (1980), Appendix D.
 T. Skwarnicki, A study of the radiative CASCADE transitions between the Upsilon-Prime and Upsilon resonances, Ph.D Thesis, DESY F31-86-02(1986), Appendix E.

Functions and mappings
Continuous distributions
Experimental particle physics